Vanves–Malakoff is a railway station in Vanves, Hauts-de-Seine, Paris, France. The station was opened in 1883 and is located on the Paris–Brest railway. The train services are operated by SNCF.

Just north of the station is the start of the LGV Atlantique high-speed line to the west and south-west of France, used by TGV trains.

Train services
The following services call at Vanves–Malakoff:
 Regional services (Transilien) Paris–Versailles–St-Quentin-en-Yvelines–Rambouillet
 Regional services (Transilien) Paris–Versailles–Plaisir
 Regional services (Transilien) Paris–Versailles–Plaisir–Mantes-la-Jolie

External links

 

Railway stations in Hauts-de-Seine
Railway stations in France opened in 1883